UEC-Aviadvigatel JSC (Russian: АО "ОДК-Авиадвигатель", lit. Aeroengine) is a Russian developer and builder of aircraft engines, most notably jet engines for commercial aircraft. Based at the Perm Engine Plant, its products power the Ilyushin Il-76MF, Ilyushin Il-96, Tupolev Tu-204, and Tupolev Tu-214. It also designs and builds high-efficiency gas turbine units for electric power stations and for gas pumping plants. The company has its background in the Experimental Design Bureau-19 plant, set up to manufacture aircraft engines.

History

Foundation and Shvetsov era

Aviadvigatel can be traced back to the engine design and manufacturing factory (Plant No.19) founded in Perm Krai, Russian Soviet Republic, on 1 June 1934, to produce the Wright Cyclone-derived Shvetsov M-25. Arkadiy Shvetsov was named chief designer at the plant, which was also referred to as the Perm Design/Engine School. The school was given the Soviet Experimental Design Bureau designation of OKB-19, and was informally referred to as the Shvetsov Design Bureau.

The first engine to be built at OKB-19 was a licensed variant of the Wright R-1820-F3 Cyclone 9, designated the Shvetsov M-25 radial engine. Other Shvetsov-designed piston engines produced at OKB-19 were the M-11, M-71 ASh-2, ASh-21, ASh-62, ASh-73, and ASh-82. In just four years OKB-19 became the major designer and provider of radial aircraft engines for the Soviet aircraft industry. Aleksandr Mikulin's and Vladimir Klimov's separate OKB design bureaus were assigned for the creation of inline engines.

During World War II the plant exceeded its original design capacity by a factor of 12, producing more than 32,000 engines for Lavochkin La-5, Sukhoi Su-2 and Tupolev Tu-2s. In the 1950s the factory transitioned from piston engines to jet engines. The plant has consolidated its position and has become a regular partner and supplier of products for Tupolev, Ilyushin, Mikoyan, Mil, and Myasishchev.

Soloviev era 
After the death of Shvetsov in 1953, leadership was taken over by Pavel Alexandrovich Soloviev, and the OKB was referred to afterwards as the Soloviev Design Bureau. Under Soloviev, the company became notable for the D-15 engine that powered the Myasishchev M-50 in 1957. Other notable designs included the D-25 turboshaft and D-20 and D-30 turbofans.

Post-Soviet era 

Since 1989, and up to June, 2001, with a break in 1995-1997, the enterprise was headed by Yuri Evgenievich Reshetnikov.

The Perm Engine Company was established in 1997 as a subsidiary of Perm Motors Company, inheriting the gas turbine production facility and the rich traditions of the largest company of the West Ural. In June 2001 Alexander A. Inozemtsev, the chief designer, became the general director of Aviadvigatel Open Joint Stock Company (OJSC). Starting in October 2006, he was the managing director and chief designer.

In October 2003, "Perm Motors Group Management Company" was established to: 1) coordinate corporate relations and management of the Perm Motors Group companies, 2) resolve strategic marketing matters, and 3) perform investment planning.

"Aviadvigatel" OJSC was merged into the Perm Engine Company, Perm Motors Group.

Products

Current products 
 Aviadvigatel PD-12 turboshaft, an upgrade for the Mi-26, to replace the Ukrainian D-136
 Aviadvigatel PS-12
 Aviadvigatel PS-30, D30K variants, D30F6
 Aviadvigatel PD-14 high-bypass turbofan, will power the Irkut MC-21
 PD-18R geared turbofan 180 kN
 PD-12V PD14V Turboshaft 8,500 kW (11,400 shp) for Mi-26
 Aviadvigatel PD-30
 UMPO R-195 engine for Su-25
 Aviadvigatel PS-90 high-bypass turbofan, which powers Ilyushin Il-76 variants, Ilyushin Il-96 variants, Beriev A-50, and Tupolev Tu-204/214 series
 GP-2 (PS-90-GP-2) Gas Turbine
 GPA-5,5 (Taurus 60)
 GTE-25P (PS-90GP-25) based on PS-90 and GTA-25 unit GTU-25P Gas Turbine
 GTU-16P on basis PS-90A and GTU-12P
 GTU-12P based on D-30, other GTs (like GTU4P GTU6P)
 GTU-8 (6-8,5 MW) and GTU-16 (12,4-16,5 MW) from PD-14
 GTU-30P 30 34 MW  GTE30 based on D-30F6 and PS-90
 GTA-14 14 MW based on Titan-130 Solar Turbines
 GTU-32P (up to 34 40 MW) on basis D-30F6 and MS5002E (GPU32 "Ladoga" built in NZL plant in Saint Petersburg)
 GTE180 GTE160 GT100 GTE65; unit M94yu2
Building and Development
 PD-24 (around ± 240 kN)
 PD-28 (around ± 280 kN)
 PD-35 (up to 300/328 kN max 350) for An-124 transport and airliners (along PD24 PD28 scaled up PD14 PD18 cores)
 GTUs 30 and 40 MW

Shvetsov engines 
 Shvetsov ASh-2 - four-row, 28 cylinder radial developed from the ASh-82, 1949; Shvetsov's last piston engine
 Shvetsov ASh-21 - single-row, 7 cylinder version of ASh-82, 1947
 Shvetsov ASh-62 - known as M-62 before 1941; improved M-25 with a two-speed supercharger and improved induction system, 1937
 Shvetsov ASh-73 - two-row, 18-cylinder radial developed from the M-72, 1947
 Shvetsov ASh-82 - also known as M-82; two-row, 14 cylinder radial developed from the M-62, 1940
 Shvetsov ASh-83 - boosted version of ASh-82FN, 1944
 Shvetsov ASh-84
 Shvetsov M-11 - five-cylinder radial, 1923
 Shvetsov M-22 - Bristol Jupiter built under license, 1918
 Shvetsov M-25 - Wright R-1820-F3 Cyclone built under license, 1934
 Shvetsov M-63 - improved M-62 with more power due to higher compression and higher redline, 1939
 Shvetsov M-64
 Shvetsov M-70 - two-row, 18-cylinder version of the M-25, 1938; cancelled due to failures of the master connecting rod and the supercharger impeller
 Shvetsov M-71 - improved M-70, 1939; cancelled as there was no production capacity available
 Shvetsov M-72 - boosted version of M-71, 1945; superseded by the ASh-73
 Shvetsov M-80
 Shvestov M-81
 Shvetsov M-93

Soloviev engines 
 Soloviev D-20 low-bypass turbofan, which powered the Tupolev Tu-124
 Soloviev D-25 turboshaft, which powers the Mil Mi-6, Mil Mi-10
 Soloviev D-30 two-shaft, low-bypass turbofan, which powers the Tupolev Tu-134A-3, A-5, and B, Mikoyan-Gurevich MiG-31, Ilyushin Il-62, Ilyushin Il-76 variants, Beriev A-40, and the Tupolev Tu-154

See also 
UEC-Perm Engines
Phazotron-NIIR

References

External links 
 Aviadvigatel company website (English)

Aircraft engine manufacturers of Russia
Gas turbine manufacturers
Companies based in Perm, Russia
 
Aircraft engine manufacturers of the Soviet Union
United Engine Corporation
Engine manufacturers of Russia
Design bureaus